The 2018–19 Northern Football Alliance consists of 48 teams split over 3 leagues of 16 teams.

Premier Division 
The following 3 clubs left the Northern Alliance Premier Division before the season -

 Birtley Town - promoted to Northern League Division 2
 Ashington Colliers - resigned from the league
 Northbank Carlisle - resigned from the league

The following 5 clubs joined the Northern Alliance Premier Division before the season -

 Alnwick Town - relegated from Northern League Division Two
 AFC New Fordley - promoted from Northern Alliance Division 1
 Newcastle Blue Star - promoted from Northern Alliance Division 1
 Newcastle Chemfica - promoted from Northern Alliance Division 1
 Killingworth YPC - promoted from Northern Alliance Division 1

Other changes to Northern Alliance Premier Division before the season -

 Killingworth Town & Killingworth YPC merged / renamed AFC Killingworth
 Hazlerigg Victory renamed Newcastle Blue Star

Division 1

The following 5 clubs left the Northern Alliance Division 1 before the season -

 AFC New Fordley - promoted to Northern Alliance Premier Division
 Newcastle Blue Star - promoted to Northern Alliance Premier Division
 Newcastle Chemfica - promoted to Northern Alliance Premier Division
 Killingworth YPC - promoted to Northern Alliance Premier Division
 Cramlington Town – relegated to Northern Alliance Division 2

The following 5 clubs joined the Northern Alliance Division 1 before the season -

 Blyth Spartans Reserves - promoted from Northern Alliance Division 2
 Prudhoe Youth Club - promoted from Northern Alliance Division 2
 Winlaton Vulcans - promoted from Northern Alliance Division 2
 Bedlington FC - promoted from Northern Alliance Division 2
 Blyth Town - promoted from Northern Alliance Division 2

Other changes to Northern Alliance Division 1 before the season -

 Hebburn Reyrolle renamed Hebburn Town U23s

Division 2 
The following 5 clubs left the Northern Alliance Division 2 before the season -

 Blyth Spartans Reserves - promoted to Northern Alliance Division 1
 Prudhoe Youth Club Seniors - promoted to Northern Alliance Division 1
 Winlaton Vulcans - promoted to Northern Alliance Division 1
 Bedlington FC - promoted to Northern Alliance Division 1
 Blyth Town - promoted to Northern Alliance Division 1

The following 5 clubs joined the Northern Alliance Division 2 before the season -

 Burradon FC – elected into the league
 Ellington - promoted from Tyneside Amateur League
 Jesmond - promoted from Tyneside Amateur League
 Stobswood Welfare - promoted from Tyneside Amateur League
 Rothbury - promoted from North Northumberland League

Other changes to Northern Alliance Division 2 before the season -

 Seghill FC renamed Seaton Sluice FC
 Whitburn Athletic renamed Whitburn & Cleadon

References

Northern Football Alliance